Asansol Junction–Mumbai Chhatrapati Shivaji Maharaj Terminus Superfast Express is a Superfast train of the Indian Railways connecting  in West Bengal and Chhatrapati Shivaji Maharaj Terminus of Maharashtra. It is currently being operated with 12361/12362 train numbers on once a week basis.

Service

12361/ Asansol–Mumbai CSMT SF Express has an average speed of 62 km/hr and covers 1294 km in 34 hrs 30 mins. 12362/Mumbai CSMT–Asansol SF Express has an average speed of 56 km/hr and 2039 km in 36 hrs 10 mins.

Route and halts 

The important halts of the train are:

Coach composition

The train has standard ICF rakes with max speed of 110 kmph. The train consists of 23 coaches :

 1 AC II Tier
 2 AC III Tier
 13 Sleeper coaches
 5 General
 2 Second-class Luggage/parcel van

Traction

This train is hauled end-to-end by an Asansol-based WAP-4 electric locomotive from Asansol to CSMT, and vice versa.

See also 

 Asansol Junction railway station
 Chhatrapati Shivaji Maharaj Terminus railway station

Notes

External links 

 12361/Asansol - Mumbai CST SF Express
 12362/Mumbai CST - Asansol SF Express

References 

Transport in Asansol
Transport in Mumbai
Express trains in India
Rail transport in West Bengal
Rail transport in Jharkhand
Rail transport in Bihar
Rail transport in Uttar Pradesh
Rail transport in Madhya Pradesh
Rail transport in Maharashtra